The metre per second  is the unit of both speed (a scalar quantity) and velocity (a vector quantity, which has direction and magnitude) in the International System of Units (SI), equal to the speed of a body covering a distance of one metre in a time of one second.

Sometimes it is abbreviated as "mps".

Conversions
 is equivalent to:
 = 3.6 km/h (exactly)
 ≈ 3.2808 feet per second (approximately)
 ≈ 2.2369 miles per hour (approximately)
 ≈ 1.9438 knots (approximately)

1 foot per second =  (exactly)

1 mile per hour =  (exactly)

1 km/h =  (exactly)

Relation to other measures
The benz, named in honour of Karl Benz, has been proposed as a name for one metre per second.  Although it has seen some support as a practical unit, primarily from German sources, it was rejected as the SI unit of velocity and has not seen widespread use or acceptance.

Unicode character 
The "metre per second" symbol is encoded by Unicode at code point .

See also
 Orders of magnitude (speed)
 Metre per second squared
 Metre

References

External links
Official BIPM definition of the metre
Official BIPM definition of the second

Units of velocity
SI derived units